Acreichthys radiatus, commonly known as the radial filefish or the radial leatherjacket, is a species of demersal marine fish which belongs to the family Monacanthidae widespread throughout the tropical waters of the western Pacific Ocean, including the Ryukyu Islands, the Philippines, the oriental part of Indonesia, Papua New Guinea, the north east area of Australia, and New Caledonia. It is a small size fish that can reach a maximum size of 7 centimeters (2.7 inches) in length.

Description 
On average, a mature male ranges from 2.2 to 4.9 centimeters (0.9–1.9 inches) in length, while a mature female is 2.1–3.4 centimeters (0.8–1.3 inches) long. It has two dorsal spines, 26–29 soft rays, and 25–27 anal soft rays. The males develop bristles on their caudal peduncles when they reach sexual maturity.

Ecology 
This species occurs in coral reefs at depths of 2–12 meters (6.5–39.3 feet). It is usually found among soft corals and is believed to feed off of both the coral polyps and the coral tissue. To survive, it needs water temperatures of 28.1–28.7 degrees Celsius (82.6–83.7 degrees Fahrenheit) and dissolved oxygen concentration of 4.45–4.47 mL/L (4450-4470 ppm).

References

External links
 Acreichthys radiatus on WoRMS
 http://eol.org/pages/220611/details
 

Monacanthidae
Fish described in 1900